Demian Ihnatovych (Mnohohrishny) (1621, Korop – 1703) was the Hetman of Left-bank Ukraine from 1669 to 1672. See The Ruin (Ukrainian history)

His surname literally means "of many sins".

In 1689 he participated in signing of the Treaty of Nerchinsk and became de facto voivode of Buriatia 1691–1694.

Biography
Demian Ihnatovych (Mnohohrishny) was born in Korop (1621-1701), Chernihiv Voivodeship (Chernihiv region now).
He took part in National Liberation War under the leadership of B. Khmelnytsky. From 1665 to 1668 he held the government of the Chernihiv colonel.
In 1668 Ihnatovych, as an opponent of the Andrusiy Armistis (in 1667 Ukraine was divided along the Dnieper into the Right Bank under the control of the Commonwealth and the Left Bank controlled by Muscovy) took part in the anti-Moscow uprising. He was one of the first colonels to side with the Right Bank Hetman Petro Doroshenko, proposing to the latter to unite all of Ukraine under his mace.
In 1668 he was appointed Hetman of the Right Bank Petro Doroshenko Hetman of the Left Bank of Ukraine. The lack of military assistance from Petro Doroshenko, strong Moscow garrisons in the Left Bank cities, pressure from the pro-Moscow part of the officers and the Orthodox clergy, prompted Demian Ihnatovych to negotiate with the tsarist government.
On December 17, 1668, by the decision of the Novgorod-Siversky Cossack Council, D. Ihnatovych headed the government on the Left Bank and on behalf of all the officers continued negotiations with the king. Moscow, however, did not recognize his title to the Glukhov Council in 1669. It was at the Hlukhiv Council thet the Moscow state confirmed the election of D. Ihnatovych as Hetman of the Left Bank of Ukraine, and in one of the points of the Hlukhiv Articles it was proclaimed: "Hetman to be in Baturyn!". Thus Baturyn became the hetman's capital.

Domestic policy
Demian Ihnatovych pursued a policy aimed at protecting the state interests of Ukraine:
-ensured that Kyiv and the district, despite the terms of the Andrusiv Armistice, remained part of the Left Bank;
-relied on regiments of comrades (free-lance regiments of cavalry) and sought to strengthen the hetman's power, gradually weakening the political role of the Cossack officers;
-looking for allies in the fight against Moscow's expansion, he held secret talks with Petro Doroshenko about the possibility of the Left Bank Hetmanate to the protectorate of the Ottoman Empire. 
Such a policy caused dissatisfaction among some of the senior officials. Simeon Adamovich (Nizhyn archpriest) wrote a denunciation of the hetman in Moscow.
On the night of March 12–13, 1672, Demian Ihnatovych was arrested in Baturyn with the support of the Moscow garrison. Hetman and his brother Vasily were brought to Moscow, where the trial began in mid-April 1672. After interrogation and torture in prison, they were accused of treason and sentenced to death, which was replaced at the last minute by exile to Siberia with their families. Until 1688 D. Ihnatovych was kept in the Irkutsk prison and Selenginsk from the insurgent local tribes. In 1689, Demian Ihnatovych took part in the negotiations of the Ambassador of Muscovy F. Golovin with China, which ended with the signing of the Treaty of Nerchinsk. After Golovin's departure, Ihnatovych ruled Selenginsky and his lands for several years as a "man of command." In 1696 the former hetman was tonsured a monk. The last mention of him in his lifetime dates back to 1701. Apparently, he died the same year and was buried near the Savior Cathedral in Selenginsk.

Honoring the memory
A monument to Hetman Demian Ihnatovych has been erected in Baturyn, which is located in the composition of Baturyn Hetmans "Hetmans. Prayer for Ukraine" (2008).
A monument to Hetman Demian Ihnatovych was unveiled on October 20, 2016, in the Selenginsky district of Buryatia at the intersection of the Ulan-Ude-Kyakhta and Ulan-Ude-Jida roads, near Novoselenginsk.
On December 14, 2018, a memorial sign in honor of the 350th anniversary of the election of Demian Ihnatovych as Hetman of the Left Bank of Ukraine was erected on the territory of the Savior-Transfiguration Monastery in Novgorod-Siverski.

References

External links
 Demian Mnohohrishny at the Encyclopedia of Ukraine

1631 births
1703 deaths
People from Chernihiv Oblast
Hetmans of Zaporizhian Host
Russian diplomats
Zaporozhian Cossack military personnel of the Khmelnytsky Uprising
Colonels of the Cossack Hetmanate
Ukrainian exiles in the Russian Empire